The Bee Gees: How Can You Mend A Broken Heart is an Emmy Award winning American documentary film, directed by Frank Marshall. It follows the life and career of legendary, award-winning family band The Bee Gees.

The film had its worldwide release on December 12, 2020 through HBO Max. It received positive reviews and has been nominated for six Emmy Awards, including the Emmy Award for Outstanding Documentary or Nonfiction Special.

Synopsis
The film follows the life and career of brothers Maurice, Robin and Barry Gibb, The Bee Gees. It includes interviews with Barry, alongside other musicians and individuals including Justin Timberlake, Noel Gallagher, Nick Jonas, Chris Martin, Eric Clapton, Mark Ronson, Lulu, Vince Melouney, Alan Kendall, Bill Oakes, Andy Gibb and Yvonne Gibb.

Production
The film is directed by Emmy nominated director Frank Marshall, and written by Mark Monroe, with Barry Gibb participating for interviews with HBO for the documentary.

Release
The film was released worldwide on HBO Max on December 12, 2020, in association with Polygram Entertainment.

Reception
The review aggregator website Rotten Tomatoes surveyed  and assessed 50 as positive and 2 as negative for  rating. The critics consensus reads "Blessed with the Bee Gees' discography and director Frank Marshall's concise thesis, How Can You Mend a Broken Heart is a poignant documentary that persuasively argues the trio's importance in music history."

Accolades

See also
 Bee Gees 
 How Can You Mend a Broken Heart 
 HBO 
 HBO Max

References

External links
 
 

2020 films
2020 documentary films
Documentary films about musical groups
Films directed by Frank Marshall
HBO documentary films
Primetime Emmy Award-winning broadcasts
2020s English-language films
2020s American films